The DuMont Evening News was an American news program which aired Monday through Friday at 7:15pm ET on the DuMont Television Network during the 1954–1955 season. Presented by Morgan Beatty, the 15-minute show was the network's third and final attempt at a nightly news broadcast.

History
The network's previous attempts at successful news broadcasts were The Walter Compton News (June 1947 to 1948, moving from WTTG in Washington DC to the network on August 25, 1947) and I.N.S. Telenews / Camera Headlines (January 1948 to 1949).

The DuMont Evening News was shown from 7:15-7:30 PM ET, immediately following the popular Captain Video. The show was one of the many axed due to the network's financial problems.

Beatty had been lured over from NBC News. After DuMont's newscast folded, he returned to NBC. He is best known for being the first to broadcast a news bulletin announcing that the Russians had launched Sputnik 1 on October 4, 1957, over the NBC Radio Network.

Episode status
As with most DuMont programs, no episodes are known to exist. Kinescopes were not available until the fall of 1947, and were used sparingly in its early years.

See also
 The Walter Compton News
 Camera Headlines
 I.N.S. Telenews
 Television news in the United States
 List of programs broadcast by the DuMont Television Network
 List of surviving DuMont Television Network broadcasts

Bibliography
 David Weinstein, The Forgotten Network: DuMont and the Birth of American Television (Philadelphia: Temple University Press, 2004) 
 Alex McNeil, Total Television, Fourth edition (New York: Penguin Books, 1980) 
 Tim Brooks and Earle Marsh, The Complete Directory to Prime Time Network TV Shows, Third edition (New York: Ballantine Books, 1964)

External links
 DuMont Evening News at IMDB
 Early TV Anchors
 The DuMont Television Network: News and Sports

1954 American television series debuts
1955 American television series endings
1950s American television news shows
Black-and-white American television shows
Lost television shows
DuMont news programming